Reinhard Gehlen (3 April 1902 – 8 June 1979) was a German lieutenant-general and intelligence officer. He was chief of the Wehrmacht Foreign Armies East military intelligence service on the eastern front and a leading member of the anti-Nazi 20 July plot during World War II. During the early Cold War, Gehlen sided with the Western Allies as the spymaster of the CIA-funded anti-Soviet Gehlen Organisation (1946–56) and the founding president of the Federal Intelligence Service (Bundesnachrichtendienst, BND) of West Germany (1956–68).

Gehlen became a professional soldier in 1920 during the Weimar Republic. In 1942, he became chief of Foreign Armies East (FHO), the German Army's military intelligence unit on the Eastern Front (1941–45). He achieved the rank of major general before he was fired by Adolf Hitler in April 1945 because of the FHO's "defeatism", the pessimistic intelligence reports about Red Army superiority.

In late 1945, following the 7 May surrender of Germany and the start of the Cold War, the U.S. military (G-2 Intelligence) recruited him to establish the Gehlen Organisation, an espionage network focusing on the Soviet Union. The organisation would employ former military officers of the Wehrmacht as well as former intelligence officers of the Schutzstaffel (SS) and the Sicherheitsdienst (SD). As head of the Gehlen Organization he sought cooperation with the Central Intelligence Agency (CIA), formed in 1947, resulting in the Gehlen Organization ultimately becoming closely affiliated with the CIA.

Gehlen was instrumental in negotiations to establish an official West German intelligence service based on the Gehlen Organisation of the early 1950s. In 1956, the Gehlen Organisation was transferred to the West German government and formed the core of the Federal Intelligence Service, the Federal Republic of Germany's official foreign intelligence service, with Gehlen serving as its first president until his retirement in 1968. While this was a civilian office, he was also a lieutenant-general in the Reserve forces of the Bundeswehr, the highest-ranking reserve-officer in the military of West Germany. He received the Grand Cross of the Order of Merit of the Federal Republic of Germany in 1968.

Early life 
Gehlen was born 1902 into a Catholic family in Erfurt. He had two brothers and a sister. He grew up in Breslau where his father, a former army officer became book publisher for the Ferdinand-Hirt-Verlag, a publishing house specializing in school books.

In 1920, Gehlen made Abitur and joined the Reichswehr.

After graduating from the German Staff College in 1935, Gehlen was promoted to captain and assigned to the German General Staff. Gehlen served on the General Staff until 1936 and was promoted to major in 1939.

Second World War
At the time of the German attack on Poland (1 September 1939), he was a staff officer in an infantry division. In 1940, he became liaison officer to Field Marshal Walther von Brauchitsch, Army Commander-in-Chief; and later was transferred to the staff of General Franz Halder, the Chief of the German General Staff. In July 1941, he received a promotion to lieutenant-colonel and was sent to the Eastern Front, where he was assigned as senior intelligence-officer to the Fremde Heere Ost (FHO) section of the Staff.

Head of FHO 

In spring of 1942, Gehlen assumed command of the Fremde Heere Ost (FHO) from Colonel Eberhard Kinzel. Before the Wehrmacht disasters in the Battle of Stalingrad (23 August 1942 – 2 February 1943), a year into the German war against the Soviet Union, Gehlen understood that the FHO required fundamental re-organisation, and secured a staff of army linguists and geographers, anthropologists, lawyers, and junior military officers who would improve the FHO as a military-intelligence organisation despite the Nazi ideology of Slavic inferiority.

Hitler assassination plot, 1944 
In summer 1944, German Resistance leaders Colonel Henning von Tresckow, Colonel Claus von Stauffenberg, and General Adolf Heusinger recruited Gehlen into participate in their 20 July plot to assassinate Adolf Hitler and overthrow the Nazi Party. As head of the FHO, Gehlen allowed the military conspirators to make their plans under his protection, and he was present at their meetings at Berchtesgaden. However, after the assassination attempt and subsequent coup d'etat failed on 20 July 1944, he escaped falling victim to Hitler's 4,500 revenge killings.

Dismissal, 1945 
Gehlen's cadre of FHO intelligence-officers produced accurate field-intelligence about the Red Army that frequently contradicted rear-echelon perceptions of the eastern battle front. Hitler dismissed the gathered information as defeatism and philosophically harmful to the Nazi cause against "Judeo-Bolshevism" in Russia. In April 1945, despite the accuracy of the intelligence, Hitler dismissed Gehlen, soon after his promotion to major general.

Preparation for Post-War 
The FHO collection of both military and political intelligence from captured Red Army soldiers assured Gehlen's post–WWII survival as a Western anticommunist spymaster, with networks of spies and secret agents in the countries of Soviet-occupied Europe. During the German war against the Soviet Union in 1941 to 1945, Gehlen's FHO collected much tactical military intelligence about the Red Army, and much strategic political intelligence about the Soviet Union. Understanding that the Soviet Union would defeat and occupy the Third Reich, Gehlen ordered the FHO intelligence files copied to microfilm; the FHO files proper were stored in watertight drums and buried in various locations in the Austrian Alps.

They amounted to fifty cases of German intelligence about the Soviet Union, which were at Gehlen's disposal for sale to western intelligence services. Meanwhile, as of 1946, when the Soviets consolidated their hegemony and sphere of influence in Central, Eastern, and Southeastern Europe as agreed at the Potsdam Conference of 1945 and demarcated with what became known as the Iron Curtain, the Western Allies of World War II, the U.S, Britain, and France had no sources of covert information within the countries in which the occupying Red Army had vanquished the Wehrmacht.

Cold War
On 22 May 1945, Gehlen surrendered to the Counter Intelligence Corps (CIC) of the U.S. Army in Bavaria and was taken to Camp King, near Oberursel, and interrogated by Captain John R. Boker. The American Army recognised his potential value as a spymaster with great knowledge of Soviet forces and anticommunist intelligence contacts in the Soviet Union. In exchange for his own liberty and the release of his former subordinates (also prisoners of the US Army), Gehlen offered the Counter Intelligence Corps access to the FHO's intelligence archives and to his intelligence gathering abilities aimed at the Soviet Union, known later as the Gehlen Organization. Boker removed his name and those of his Wehrmacht command from the official lists of German prisoners of war, and transferred seven former FHO senior officers to join Gehlen.

The FHO archives were unearthed and secretly taken to Camp King, ostensibly without the knowledge of the camp commander. By the end of summer 1945, Captain Boker had the support of Brigadier General Edwin Sibert, the G2 (senior intelligence officer) of the U.S. Twelfth Army Group, who arranged the secret transport of Gehlen, his officers and the FHO intelligence archives, authorized by his superiors in the chain of command, General Walter Bedell Smith (chief of staff for General Eisenhower), who worked with William Donovan (former OSS chief) and Allen Dulles (OSS chief), who also was the OSS station-chief in Bern. On 20 September 1945, Gehlen and three associates were flown from the American Zone of Occupation in Germany to the US, to become spymasters for the Western Allies.

In July 1946, the US officially released Gehlen and returned him to occupied Germany. On 6 December 1946, he began espionage operations against the Soviet Union, by establishing what was known to US intelligence as the Gehlen Organisation or "the Org", a secret intelligence service composed of former intelligence officers of the Wehrmacht and members of the SS and the SD, which was headquartered first at Oberursel, near Frankfurt, then at Pullach, near Munich. The organisation's cover-name was the South German Industrial Development Organization. Gehlen initially selected 350 ex-Wehrmacht military intelligence officers as his staff; eventually, the organisation recruited some 4,000 anticommunist secret agents.

Gehlen Organisation, 1947–56 

After he started working for the U.S. Government, Gehlen was subordinate to US Army G-2 (Intelligence). He resented this arrangement and in 1947, the year after his Organisation was established, Gehlen arranged for a transfer to the Central Intelligence Agency (CIA). The agency kept close control of the Gehlen Organisation, because during the early years of the Cold War of 1945–91, Gehlen's agents were providing the United States Federal Government with more than 70% of its intelligence on the Soviet armed forces.

Early in 1948, Gehlen Org Spymasters began receiving detailed reports from their sources throughout the Soviet Zone of covert East German remilitarization long before any West German politicians had even thought of such a thing. Further operations by the Gehlen Org produced detailed reports about Soviet construction and testing of the MiG-15 jet-propelled aircraft, which United States airmen flying F86 fighters would soon to face in aerial combat during the Korean War.

Between 1947 and 1955, agents of the Gehlen Organisation also interviewed every German PoW who returned to West Germany from captivity in the Soviet Union. The network employed hundreds of former Wehrmacht and SS officers, and also recruited many agents from within the massive anti-Communist Soviet and East European refugee communities throughout Western Europe. They observed the operations of the railroad systems, airfields, and ports of the USSR, and their secret agents infiltrated the Baltic Soviet Republics and the Ukrainian SSR. 

Among the Org's earliest counterespionage successes was Operation Bohemia, which began in March 1948 after Bozena Hajek, the sister in law of Czechoslovak Socialist Republic military intelligence chief Captain Vojtech Jerabek, defected to the American Zone. After learning from Hajek that Captain Jerabek was secretly expressing anti-communist opinions to his family, the Org dispatched a Czech refugee and veteran field agent codenamed "Ondrej" to make contact with the Captain and his family in Prague. During the night of 8-9 November 1948, after being warned by "Ondrej" of an imminent Stalinist witch hunt for "rootless cosmopolitans" within the Czechoslovak officer corps, Captain Jerabek and two other senior Czechoslovakian military intelligence officers crossed the border into the American Zone and defected to the West. In addition to several lists of Czechoslovakian spies in West Germany, Captain Jerabek also carried the keys to breaking Czechoslovakian intelligence's codes. The results were nothing less than devastating for Czechoslovakian espionage and led to multiple arrests and convictions.

The security and efficacy of the Gehlen Organisation were compromised by East German and Soviet moles within it, such as Johannes Clemens, Erwin Tiebel and Heinz Felfe who were feeding information while in the Org and later, while in the BND that was headed by Gehlen. All three were eventually discovered and convicted in 1963.

There were also Communists and their sympathizers within the CIA and the SIS (MI6), especially Kim Philby and the Cambridge Spies. As such information appeared, Gehlen, personally, and the Gehlen Organisation, officially, were attacked by the governments of the Western powers. The British government was especially hostile towards Gehlen, and the politically Left wing British press ensured full publicisation of the existence of the Gehlen Organisation, which further compromised the operation.

Federal Intelligence Service (BND), 1956–1968 

On 1 April 1956, 11 years after World War II had ended, the U.S. Government and the CIA formally transferred the Gehlen Organisation to the authority of what was by then the Federal Republic of Germany, under Chancellor Konrad Adenauer (1949–63). By way of that transfer of geopolitical sponsorship, the anti–Communist Gehlen Organisation became the nucleus of the Bundesnachrichtendienst (BND, Federal Intelligence Service).

Gehlen became president of the BND as an espionage service, until he was forced out of office in 1968. The end of Gehlen's career as a spymaster resulted from a confluence of events in West Germany: the exposure of a KGB mole, Heinz Felfe, (a former SS lieutenant) working at BND headquarters; political estrangement from Adenauer, in 1963, which aggravated his professional problems; and the inefficiency of the BND consequent to Gehlen's poor leadership and continual inattention to the business of counter-espionage as national defence.

Gehlen's refusal to correct reports with questionable content strained the organization's credibility, and dazzling achievements became an infrequent commodity. A veteran agent remarked at the time that the BND pond then contained some sardines, though a few years earlier the pond had been alive with sharks.

The fact that the BND could score certain successes despite East German Stasi interference, internal malpractice, inefficiencies and infighting, was primarily due to select members of the staff who took it upon themselves to step up and overcome then existing maladies. Abdication of responsibility by Reinhard Gehlen was the malignancy; bureaucracy and cronyism remained pervasive, even nepotism (at one time Gehlen had 16 members of his extended family on the BND payroll). Only slowly did the younger generation then advance to substitute new ideas for some of the bad habits caused mainly by Gehlen's semi-retired attitude and frequent holiday absences.

Gehlen was forced out of the BND due to "political scandal within the ranks", according to one source, He retired in 1968 as a civil servant of West Germany, classified as a Ministerialdirektor, a senior grade with a generous pension. His successor, Bundeswehr Brigadier General Gerhard Wessel, immediately called for a program of modernization and streamlining.

Honours 
Iron Cross second class
War Merit Cross second and first class with swords
German Cross in silver (1945)
Grand Cross of the Order pro Merito Melitensi of the Sovereign Military Order of Malta (1948)
Grand Cross of the Order of Merit of the Federal Republic of Germany (1968)
Good Conduct Medal (United States)

Criticism 
Several publications have criticized the fact that Gehlen allowed former Nazis to work for the agencies. The authors of the book A Nazi Past: Recasting German Identity in Postwar Europe stated that Reinhard Gehlen simply did not want to know the backgrounds of the men whom the BND hired in the 1950s. The American National Security Archive states that "he employed numerous former Nazis and known war criminals".

An article in The Independent on 29 June 2018 made this statement about BND employees: "Operating until 1956, when it was superseded by the BND, the Gehlen Organisation was allowed to employ at least 100 former Gestapo or SS officers.... Among them were Adolf Eichmann’s deputy Alois Brunner, who would go on to die of old age despite having sent more than 100,000 Jews to ghettos or internment camps, and ex-SS major Emil Augsburg.... Many ex-Nazi functionaries including Silberbauer, the captor of Anne Frank, transferred over from the Gehlen Organisation to the BND.... Instead of expelling them, the BND even seems to have been willing to recruit more of them – at least for a few years".

On the other hand, Gehlen himself was cleared by the CIA's James H. Critchfield, who worked with the Gehlen Organization from 1949 to 1956. In 2001, he said that "almost everything negative that has been written about Gehlen, [as an] ardent ex-Nazi, one of Hitler's war criminals ... is all far from the fact," as quoted in the Washington Post. Critchfield added that Gehlen hired the former Sicherheitsdienst (Security Service of the Reichsführer-SS) men "reluctantly, under pressure from German Chancellor Konrad Adenauer to deal with 'the avalanche of subversion hitting them from East Germany'".

Legacy 
Gehlen's memoirs were published in 1977 by World Publishers, New York. In the same year another book was published about him, The General Was a Spy, by Heinz Hoehne and Herman Zolling, Coward, McCann and Geoghegan, New York, A review of the latter, published by the CIA in 1996, calls it a "poor book" and goes on to allege that "so much of it is sheer garbage" because of many errors. The CIA review also discusses another book, Gehlen, Spy of the Century, by E. H. Cookridge, Hodder and Stoughton, London, 1971, and claims that it is "chock full of errors". The CIA review is kinder when speaking of Gehlen's memoirs but makes this comment: "Gehlen's descriptions of most of his so-called successes in the political intelligence field are, in my opinion, either wishful thinking or self-delusion.... Gehlen was never a good clandestine operator, nor was he a particularly good administrator. And therein lay his failures. The Gehlen Organization/BND always had a good record in the collection of military and economic intelligence on East Germany and the Soviet forces there. But this information, for the most part, came from observation and not from clandestine penetration".Upon Gehlen's retirement in 1968, a CIA note on Gehlen describes him as "essentially a military officer in habits and attitudes". He was also characterized as "essentially a conservative", who refrained from entertaining and drinking, was fluent in English, and was at ease among senior American officials.

References

Bibliography and sources 
 Cookridge, E. H. (1971). Gehlen: Spy of the Century. London: Hodder & Stoughton; New York: Random House (1972).
 Critchfield, James H. (2003). Partners at Creation: The Men Behind Postwar Germany's Defense and Intelligence Establishments. Annapolis: Naval Institute Press. .

 Hersh, Burton (1992). The Old Boys: The American Elite and the Origins of the CIA. New York: Scribner's.
 
 Kross, Peter. "Intelligence" in Military Heritage, October 2004, pp. 26–30
 Oglesby, Carl (Fall 1990). "The Secret Treaty of Fort Hunt." CovertAction Information Bulletin.
 Reese, Mary Ellen. General Reinhard Gehlen: The CIA Connection. Fairfax, Vir.: George Mason University. 1990
 United States National Archives, Washington, D.C. NARA Collection of Foreign Records Seized, Microfilm T-77, T-78
 Weiner, Tim (2008). Legacy of Ashes: The History of the CIA. Anchor Books, pp. 10–190. .

Literature 

 John Douglas-Gray in his thriller The Novak Legacy 
 WEB Griffin, in his post-World War II novel Top Secret 
 Charles Whiting, Germany's Master Spy  (1972)

External links 
"Disclosure" newsletter, Information promulgated by the U.S. National Archives & Records Administration
 Forging an Intelligence Partnership: CIA and the Origins of the BND, 1945–49 CIA declassified documents on the Gehlen Organization.
 Reinhard Gehlen's CIA file on the Internet Archive.

1902 births
1979 deaths
Cold War history of Germany
Cold War spymasters
German anti-communists
German resistance members
German Roman Catholics
Grand Crosses with Star and Sash of the Order of Merit of the Federal Republic of Germany
Recipients of the Order pro Merito Melitensi
Lieutenant generals of the German Army
Major generals of the German Army (Wehrmacht)
Members of the 20 July plot
Military personnel from Erfurt
People from the Province of Saxony
People of the Federal Intelligence Service
Recipients of the Iron Cross (1939), 2nd class
Recipients of the War Merit Cross
Roman Catholics in the German Resistance
Spies for the Federal Republic of Germany
Spymasters
World War II spies for Germany